Skarlatos is a Greek surname and forename. 

People with the name include:

Surname
Alek Skarlatos (born 1992), American soldier, Knight of the French Legion of Honour
Konstantinos Skarlatos (1872-1969), Greek army officer and Olympic sports shooter
Vasilis Skarlatos (born 1984), Greek footballer
Nikoletta Skarlatos, actress starring in Night Train (1999 film)

Given name
Skarlatos Soutsos, Greek Minister of Affairs before 1854, succeeded by Dimitrios Kallergis

Greek-language surnames